Badin is a town located in Stanly County, North Carolina, United States. At the 2010 census, the town had a total population of 1,974.

History
The Badin Historic District, Doerschuk Site, Hardaway Site, Narrows Dam and Power Plant Complex, and West Badin Historic District are listed on the National Register of Historic Places.

Geography
Badin is located on the south end of Badin Lake which is a reservoir formed by damming the Yadkin River. North Carolina Highway 740 passes through the town. Albemarle is four miles to the southwest and New London is six miles to the northwest.

Demographics

2020 census

As of the 2020 United States census, there were 2,024 people, 506 households, and 331 families residing in the town.

2000 census
At the census of 2000, there were 1,154 people, 494 households, and 328 families residing in the town. The population density was 719.2 people per square mile (278.5/km2). There were 586 housing units at an average density of 365.2 per square mile (141.4/km2). The racial makeup of the town was 63.26% White, 35.62% African American, 0.00% Native American, 0.00% Asian, 0.00% Pacific Islander, 0.17% from other races, and 0.95% from two or more races. 0.61% of the population were Hispanic or Latino of any race.

There were 494 households, out of which 33.0% had children under the age of 18 living with them, 48.0% were married couples living together, 14.0% had a female householder with no husband present, and 33.6% were non-families. 31.2% of all households were made up of individuals, and 17.8% had someone living alone who was 65 years of age or older. The average household size was 2.34 and the average family size was 2.91.

In the town, the population was spread out, with 25.3% under the age of 18, 7.5% from 18 to 24, 26.8% from 25 to 44, 22.3% from 45 to 64, and 18.2% who were 65 years of age or older. The median age was 39 years. For every 100 females, there were 83.5 males. For every 100 females age 18 and over, there were 78.1 males.

The median income for a household in the town was $27,031, and the median income for a family was $32,692. Males had a median income of $27,396 versus $21,417 for females. The per capita income for the town was $15,320. 12.2% of the population and 9.4% of families were below the poverty line. 10.7% of those under the age of 18 and 17.1% of those 65 and older were living below the poverty line.

Economy
Badin's major employer was ALCOA, which operated a large facility in Badin until 2010. ALCOA laid off most of the workers when it shut down the factory in 2007. Alcoa Power Generating continues to generate electricity using four area dams and is working to find new uses for the plant site.

Notable people
 Star Jones, a former co-host of The View, a talk show on the American Broadcasting Company television network. She is also a former lawyer and prosecutor.
 Lou Donaldson, world-famous jazz musician and alto saxophonist.

References

External links
 Official Badin, NC website

Towns in North Carolina
Towns in Stanly County, North Carolina